The Heroic Age of Antarctic Exploration was an era in the exploration of the continent of Antarctica which began at the end of the 19th century, and ended after the First World War; the Shackleton–Rowett Expedition of 1921–1922 is often cited by historians as the dividing line between the "Heroic" and "Mechanical" ages.

During the Heroic Age, the Antarctic region became the focus of international efforts that resulted in intensive scientific and geographical exploration by 17 major Antarctic expeditions launched from ten countries. The common factor in these expeditions was the limited nature of the resources available to them before advances in transport and communication technologies revolutionized the work of exploration. Each of these expeditions therefore became a feat of endurance that tested, and sometimes exceeded, the physical and mental limits of its personnel. The "heroic" label, bestowed later, recognized the adversities which had to be overcome by these pioneers, some of whom did not survive the experience: a total of 19 expedition members died during this period.

Both the geographic and magnetic South Poles were reached for the first time during the Heroic Age. The achievement of being first to the geographical pole was the primary object in many expeditions, as well as the sole rationale for Roald Amundsen's venture, which became the first to reach it in 1911. Other expeditions aimed for different objectives in different areas of the continent. As a result of all this activity, much of the continent's coastline was discovered and mapped, and significant areas of its interior were explored. The expeditions also generated large quantities of scientific data across a wide range of disciplines, the examination and analysis of which would keep the world's scientific communities busy for decades.

Origins

Exploration of the southernmost part of the globe had been an off-and-on area of interest for centuries prior to the Heroic Age, yet the sheer isolation of the region as well as its inhospitable climate and treacherous seas presented enormous practical difficulties for early maritime technology. About a century after the Age of Exploration, British explorer James Cook became one of the first explorers known to have traveled to the region. The discoveries of his second voyage (1772–1775) changed the world map forever. Prior to this expedition it was believed that a large continent known as Terra Australis occupied the majority of the Southern Hemisphere. Cook discovered that no such landmass existed, though massive ice floes prevented his reaching Antarctica proper. In the process his expedition became the first recorded voyage to cross the Antarctic Circle. He did hypothesize that, based upon the amount of ice, there must be a landmass from which the ice originated, but was convinced that if it existed this land was too far south to be either habitable or of any economic value. Subsequently, exploration of the southern regions of the world came to a halt.

Interest was renewed again between 1819 and 1843. As Europe settled after a period of war and unrest, explorers Fabian Gottlieb von Bellingshausen, John Biscoe, John Balleny, Charles Wilkes, Jules Dumont d'Urville, and James Clark Ross sought greater knowledge of the Antarctic regions. The primary goal of these explorers was to penetrate the vast barriers of sea ice that hid Antarctica proper, beginning with Bellingshausen and Mikhail Lazarev's circumnavigation of the region in 1819–1821, during which they became the first to sight and therefore officially discover mainland Antarctica, and culminating in Wilkes' discovery of Victoria Land and naming of the volcanoes now known as Mount Terror and Mount Erebus in 1840. Much early knowledge of the lands south of the Antarctic Circle was also derived from economic pursuits by sealers and whalers, including the probable first landing on mainland Antarctica by an American sealer in 1821, though whether this landing was truly the first is disputed by historians. These explorers, despite their impressive contributions to South Polar exploration, were nonetheless unable to penetrate the interior of the continent, and their discoveries instead formed a broken line of newly discovered lands along the coastline of Antarctica.

What followed this early period of exploration is what historian H. R. Mill called "the age of averted interest". Following James Clark Ross' expedition aboard the ships HMS Erebus and HMS Terror in January 1841, Ross suggested that there were no scientific discoveries worth exploration in the far south. It has been suggested that Ross' influence, as well as the widely publicized loss of the Franklin expedition in the Arctic in 1848, led to a period of disinterest, or at least an unwillingness to invest significant resources, in polar inquiry, particularly by the Royal Society. In the twenty years following Ross' return, there was a general lull internationally in Antarctic exploration.

 
The initial impetus for the renewed exploration of the Antarctic that became known as the Heroic Age of Antarctic Exploration is somewhat contested, as it was a vague and multifarious international movement. George von Neumayer of Hamburg, also an Antarctic explorer, helped to renew Antarctic exploration from 1861 onward while he worked in an observatory in Melbourne. His particular interests were the importance of meteorology and how more information about the South Pole could lead to more accurate weather predictions. This helps explain German involvement in Antarctic research. Another important precursor to the Heroic Age of Antarctic exploration was the Dundee Antarctic Expedition of 1892–93 in which four Dundee whaling ships travelled south to the Antarctic in search of whales instead of their usual Arctic route. The expedition was accompanied by several naturalists (including Williams Speirs Bruce) and an artist, William Gordon Burn Murdoch. The publications (both scientific and popular) and exhibitions that resulted did much to reignite public interest in the Antarctic. The performance of the whaling ships was also crucial in the decision to build RRS Discovery in Dundee.

Another, particularly British, impetus more closely tied to the period is a lecture given by John Murray titled "The Renewal of Antarctic Exploration", given to the Royal Geographical Society in London, on 27 November 1893. Murray advocated that research into the Antarctic should be organised to "resolve the outstanding geographical questions still posed in the south". Shortly prior to this, in 1887, the Royal Geographic Society had instated an Antarctic Committee which successfully incited many whalers to explore the southern regions of the world and foregrounded the lecture given by Murray. In August 1895, the Sixth International Geographical Congress in London passed a general resolution calling on scientific societies throughout the world to promote the cause of Antarctic exploration "in whatever ways seem to them most effective". Such work, the resolution argued, would "bring additions to almost every branch of science". The Congress was addressed by the Norwegian Carsten Borchgrevink, who had just returned from a whaling expedition during which he had become one of the first people to set foot on the Antarctic mainland. During his address, Borchgrevink outlined plans for a full-scale pioneering Antarctic expedition, to be based at Cape Adare.

However, the inauguration of the Heroic Age is now generally considered to be an expedition launched by the Société Royale Belge de Géographie in 1897; Carsten Borchgrevink followed a year later with a privately sponsored expedition. The designation "Heroic Age" only came much later; the term is not used in any of the early expedition accounts or memoirs, nor in biographies of polar figures involved in the Heroic Age which appeared in the 1920s and 1930s. It is not clear when the term was first coined or adopted generally. It was used in March 1956 by the British explorer Duncan Carse, writing in The Times. Describing the first crossing of South Georgia by Ernest Shackleton's Imperial Trans-Antarctic Expedition in 1916, Carse wrote of "three men from the heroic age of Antarctic exploration, with 50 feet of rope between them, and a carpenter's adze".

Expeditions, 1897–1922
Notes

 The summaries in the table do not include the scientific work carried out by these expeditions, each of which brought back findings and specimens across a wide range of disciplines.
 The table does not include the numerous whaling voyages that took place during this period, or sub-Antarctic expeditions such as that of Carl Chun in 1898–1899, which did not penetrate the Antarctic Circle. Also excluded is the  Cope Expedition of 1920–1922, which collapsed through lack of funding, though two men were landed from a Norwegian whaler and spent a year on the Antarctic peninsula. Three expeditions scheduled to start in 1914 were cancelled due to the outbreak of the First World War: an Austrian Antarctic Expedition to be led by Felix König; an Anglo-Swedish expedition under Otto Nordenskjöld and Johan Gunnar Andersson, and a British expedition under Joseph Foster Stackhouse.
 † Denotes that leader died during expedition.

Expedition deaths during the Heroic Age
Twenty-two men died on Antarctic expeditions during the Heroic Age. Of these, four died of illnesses unrelated to their Antarctic experiences, and two died from accidents in New Zealand, and one in France. The remaining 15 perished during service on or near the Antarctic continent.

Another five men died shortly after returning from the Antarctic (this does not include the significant number who died on active service in the First World War):
 Engebret Knudsen, a member of the Belgian Antarctic Expedition, 1897–99, developed signs of mental illness and never fully recovered, died in 1900.
 , medical officer on the Southern Cross Expedition, 1898–1900, died of unrecorded causes during 1900.
 Jorgen Petersen, first mate on the Southern Cross, died in 1900 while returning on the ship from Australia.
 , a member of the Nimrod Expedition, 1907–09, died of self-inflicted gunshot wounds, 12 March 1910.
 Hjalmar Johansen, a member of Amundsen's 1910–12 expedition, died of self-inflicted gunshot wounds, 9 January 1913.

End of the Heroic Age
There are different views about when the Heroic Age of Antarctic Exploration came to an end. Shackleton's Endurance expedition is sometimes referred to as the last Antarctic expedition of the Heroic Age. Other chroniclers extend the era to the date of Shackleton's death, 5 January 1922, treating the Shackleton–Rowett, or Quest expedition, during which Shackleton died, as the final chapter of the Age. According to Margery and James Fisher, Shackleton's biographers: "If it were possible to draw a distinct dividing line between what has been called the Heroic Age of Antarctic Exploration and the Mechanical Age, the Shackleton–Rowett expedition might make as good a point as any at which to draw such a line". A journalist inspecting the ship before she sailed reported "Gadgets! Gadgets! Gadgets everywhere!". These included wireless, an electrically heated crow's nest and an "odograph" that could trace and record the ship's route and speed.

See also

 List of Antarctic exploration ships from the Heroic Age, 1897–1922
 Arctic exploration
 Farthest South
 History of Antarctica
 List of Antarctic expeditions
 List of polar explorers

Notes and references

Sources

Books

 

 
 
 
 
 

 

 
 
 
 
 
 
 Ivanov, Lyubomir; Ivanova, Nusha. In: The World of Antarctica. Generis Publishing, 2022. pp. 84-90. </ref>

Web sources
 
 
 
 
 
 
 
 
 
 
 
 
 
 
 
 
 Diary of Stan Taylor, Seaman on the Aurora 1912–1913 journey
 
 
 
 
 
 
   Working-Class 'Hero' after two decades of polar exploration. Portland Magazine. November 2012.

 
Exploration of Antarctica
History of Antarctica
Explorers of Antarctica
Antarctica expeditions
Antarctic expeditions
19th century in Antarctica
20th century in Antarctica